Anthony Onah (born February 10, 1983) is an Nigerian-American film director, screenwriter, and producer. He is best known for his debut feature, The Price (2017), which premiered at the 2017 South by Southwest Film Festival, where it was nominated for the Grand Jury Award. The film was also nominated for the FIPRESCI Prize in the New American Cinema Competition at the 2017 Seattle International Film Festival, and Onah won the Craig Brewer Emerging Filmmaker Award for the film at the 2017 Indie Memphis Film Festival.

In the summer of 2015, he was named to Filmmaker Magazine's list of 25 New Faces of Independent Film.

Early life and education 
Onah was born in Benue State, Nigeria. He grew up moving around with his ambassador father, Adoga Onah. After having lived in the  Philippines, United Kingdom, Nigeria, and Togo, his family settled in Arlington, VA and Washington, D.C. 

Onah studied as an undergraduate at Harvard University, where he earned a degree in biochemical sciences, receiving the Pechet Foundation grant given to junior biochemistry majors and the Thomas T. Hoopes Prize for outstanding scholarly work.

Accepted at Cambridge University for graduate school, Onah turned down admission, instead working as a scientist during which time he was published in The Journal of Neuroscience, and subsequently chose to attend the MFA program in film directing at the University of California, Los Angeles, where he was admitted with a university fellowship. He received the Hollywood Foreign Press Award and the Edie and Lew Wasserman Fellowship. He was also named to Indiewire's list of 10 Exciting New Voices. In 2011, Onah was selected as a directing fellow by Film Independent, and in 2012 as a directing talent at the Berlin Talent Campus.

His twin brother, Julius Onah, is also a director, with his second feature film The Cloverfield Paradox released in 2018.

Films 
Onah’s films include The Cure, which was recognized by mtvU, won a 2008 Directors Guild of America Award, and was featured in The Los Angeles Times. His next film True Colors world premiered at the 2011 Woodstock Film Festival. Onah subsequently completed A History of Violence with renowned cognitive psychologist Steven Pinker and Dara Ju, which won him a second student Directors Guild of America Award in 2012. With Dara Ju, Onah also won the first Afrinolly Short Film Competition, Africa's most prestigious Short Film Competition awarding a $25,000 cash prize.

His debut feature, The Price, premiered at South by Southwest in March 2017. The film received support from the Sundance Institute, IFP, Ford Foundation, and Film Independent.

References

External links 

1983 births
Living people
People from Arlington County, Virginia
Harvard University alumni
UCLA Film School alumni
Film directors from Virginia
American people of Nigerian descent
American screenwriters